Katri Susanna Mattsson (née Nokso-Koivisto; born 22 November 1982) is a Finnish former football midfielder, who most recently played for PK-35 Vantaa. She previously played for LSK Kvinner FK of the Norwegian Toppserien. Before moving to Norway she played the 2012 season with Jitex BK in the Swedish Damallsvenskan. Mattsson previously played for United Pietarsaari in the Naisten Liiga, Florida Atlantic Owls in the NCAA, Bälinge IF in the Damallsvenskan, and VfL Wolfsburg in the Bundesliga.

A member of the Finnish national team since 1999, she played in the 2009 European Championship. In June 2013, Mattsson was named in national coach Andrée Jeglertz's Finland squad for UEFA Women's Euro 2013. In January 2016, Mattsson announced her retirement from football. She had recently collected her hundredth cap for the national team, but had been plagued by pain in her knees.

References

External links
 
 
 

1982 births
Living people
Finnish women's footballers
Finland women's international footballers
Finnish expatriate footballers
Expatriate women's footballers in Germany
Expatriate women's footballers in Sweden
Expatriate women's footballers in Norway
Expatriate women's soccer players in the United States
Jitex BK players
VfL Wolfsburg (women) players
Damallsvenskan players
Florida Atlantic Owls women's soccer players
FC United (Jakobstad) players
PK-35 Vantaa (women) players
Kansallinen Liiga players
Bälinge IF players
Finnish expatriate sportspeople in Norway
Toppserien players
FIFA Century Club
Fresno State Bulldogs women's soccer players
Women's association football midfielders